Hojm-e Bala is a village in Badakhshan Province in north-eastern Afghanistan.

References

External links 
Satellite map at Maplandia.com

Populated places in Maimay District